Miarinarivo II is a rural municipality in Itasy Region, in the  Central Highlands of Madagascar. It covers the villages around the city of Miarinarivo.

Religion
 FJKM – Fiangonan'i Jesoa Kristy eto Madagasikara (Church of Jesus Christ in Madagascar)
 FLM – Fiangonana Loterana Malagasy (Malagasy Lutheran Church)

References

Populated places in Itasy Region